Analamanga is a region in central Madagascar, containing the capital Antananarivo and its surrounding metropolitan area.

Administrative divisions
Analamanga Region is divided into eight districts, which are sub-divided into 137 communes.

 Ambohidratrimo District - 24 communes
 Andramasina District - 14 communes
 Anjozorobe District - 18 communes
 Ankazobe District - 15 communes
 Antananarivo-Atsimondrano District - 26 communes
 Antananarivo-Avaradrano District - 16 communes
 Antananarivo-Renivohitra District - 1 commune; the city of Antananarivo
 Manjakandriana District - 23 communes

Geography
The region extends mainly towards the north of the capital. It is bordered by Betsiboka to the north, Bongolava and Itasy to the west, Alaotra Mangoro to the east, and Vakinankaratra to the south.

Rivers
The main rivers are the Betsiboka River and the Ikopa River.

Major lakes
Lake Mantasoa (1375 ha) and Tsiazompaniry (2333 ha).

Transport

Roads
The capital, Antananarivo is linked with several national roads:
 National Road 2 leads eastwards to Toamasina
 National Road 4 leads northwards to Mahajunga and Diego Suarez.
 National Road 7 leads southwards to Antsirabe and Fianarantsoa.
 National Road 1 leads westwards to Tsiroanomandidy and Maintirano.

Railroads
Two railroad lines exist, though there is no passenger transport:  the line to Antsirabe (158 km), and the line to Toamasina (371km).

Airport
Antananarivo airport

Protected Areas
Anjozorobe-Angavo Reserve
Ambohitantely Reserve.

Sports
 COSPN Analamanga - basketball 
 ASSM Elgeco Plus - football
 USJF Ravinala - football
 AS Saint Michel - football
 BTM Antananarivo - football
 COSFAP Antananarivo - football
 DSA Antananarivo - football, Malagasy champions 1998
 Tana FC Formation - football

See also
 Antananarivo Province

References

 Monographie Region Analamanga

External links
 Plan Régional de Développement, Région Analamanga with a presentation (in French).

 
Regions of Madagascar